John Shepherd Spencer (24 August 1920 – 1966) was an English professional association footballer who played as an inside forward.

References

1920 births
1966 deaths
People from Bacup
English footballers
Association football forwards
Burnley F.C. players
Accrington Stanley F.C. (1891) players
English Football League players